Beatrice "Bea" Angela Duran is an American politician and union grievance specialist from Las Vegas, Nevada, currently serving as a member of the Nevada Assembly.

Early life 
Duran was born in 1963 in Cheyenne, Wyoming.

Career 
In 1986, Duran, then a waitress at the Four Queens Hotel and Casino, became active in the Culinary Workers Union, the Las Vegas-based Local 226 of UNITE HERE, and was on staff as the union achieved recognition there. Since 1999 she has worked as a staff member for the Culinary Union, where she was a grievance specialist with their Culinary Grievance Department.

Politics 
In December 2018, the Clark County Commission appointed Duran as a Democratic member to represent the 11th district (portions of Las Vegas and North Las Vegas) of the Nevada Assembly, to replace Olivia Diaz (who had resigned from her Assembly seat soon after winning re-election, to run for the Las Vegas City Council).

References 

Democratic Party members of the Nevada Assembly
American trade union leaders
Women trade union leaders
Women state legislators in Nevada
Restaurant staff
21st-century American politicians
21st-century American women politicians
Living people
1963 births